The 79th district of the Texas House of Representatives consists of a portion of El Paso County. The current Representative is Claudia Ordaz, who has represented the district since 2023.

References 

79